Vaafuti Tavana (born September 25, 1987) is an American male volleyball player. He is part of the United States men's national volleyball team. On club level he plays for Jakarta BNI 46.

References

External links
 profile at FIVB.org

1987 births
Living people
American men's volleyball players
Place of birth missing (living people)